The following television stations broadcast on digital channel 28 in Mexico:
 XHAJ-TDT on Cerro de las Lajas, Veracruz
 XHAQ-TDT in Mexicali, Baja California
 XHCCQ-TDT in Cancún, Quintana Roo 
 XHCHL-TDT in Chilpancingo, Guerrero 
 XHCTGD-TDT in Guadalajara, Jalisco
 XHCTHE-TDT in Hermosillo, Sonora
 XHCUM-TDT in Cuernavaca, Morelos
 XHDD-TDT in San Luis Potosí, San Luis Potosí
 XHFAMX-TDT in Mexico City
 XHFCQ-TDT in Felipe Carrillo Puerto, Quintana Roo 
 XHGDS-TDT in Granados, Sonora 
 XHGK-TDT in Tapachula, Chiapas 
 XHHP-TDT in Soto La Marina, Tamaulipas 
 XHIXG-TDT in Ixtapa-Zihuatanejo, Guerrero 
 XHJK-TDT in Tijuana, Baja California
 XHLPT-TDT in La Paz, Baja California Sur 
 XHMAF-TDT in Mazatlán, Sinaloa 
 XHMNL-TDT in Monterrey, Nuevo León
 XHMTCH-TDT in Ciudad Juárez, Chihuahua
 XHPFE-TDT in Parras de la Fuente, Coahuila de Zaragoza
 XHSCO-TDT in Salina Cruz, Oaxaca
 XHSGX-TDT in San Agustín Loxicha, Oaxaca 
 XHST-TDT in Mérida, Yucatán 
 XHTAM-TDT in Reynosa-Matamoros, Tamaulipas
 XHTEN-TDT in Tepic, Nayarit 
 XHTHN-TDT in Tehuacán, Puebla
 XHUJED-TDT in Durango, Durango
 XHVAC-TDT in Venustiano Carranza, Chiapas 

28